Ulf Peter Jörgen Jönsson (born 29 September 1972) is a Swedish former professional ice hockey player who last played for Färjestads BK of the Swedish Elitserien. He has represented the Team Sweden 285 times, making him the record holder for most games played in the national team. Jörgen Jönsson is also the older brother of former NHL-star Kenny Jönsson, and the two played 68 games in North America together as teammates.

Career 
Jönsson started his professional career in Rögle BK and has also played in the NHL (for the New York Islanders and Mighty Ducks of Anaheim), but chose moving home after one season because he wanted to be with his family. Jönsson is a highly respected player in the Swedish national team. During his career, he was the captain of Team Sweden, unless Mats Sundin was available. On 11 February 2007, he played in his 273rd game for the national team, breaking the record held by Jonas Bergqvist, eventually playing in 285 games for the national team.

Jönsson won Guldpucken (Sweden's player of the year) in 1997.

As of the World Championship 2006 he is the only player in history who has won Olympic gold, World Championship gold and the domestic (Elitserien) playoffs during one season.

On 9 April 2009, he retired from professional hockey. Färjestads BK, for whom Jönsson played 13 seasons, has retired no. 21 in his honor.

Prior to the 2009–10 season, Jönsson was named an assistant general manager of Färjestad. Prior to that season's playoffs, he was named an assistant coach of Färjestad. In the 2010–11 season Jönsson continued to work for Färjestad as an assistant coach. After the 2010–11 season, however, it was announced that he had decided to leave Färjestad as an assistant coach.

International 
He has earned his two Olympic gold medals, two World Championship gold medals and five national gold medals and is one of Sweden's best known hockey players.

Personal life 
His brother Kenny Jönsson is also a well-known Swedish ice hockey player who spent 11 seasons in the NHL, playing for the Toronto Maple Leafs and the New York Islanders.

Career statistics

Regular season and playoffs

International

See also
 Notable families in the NHL

References

External links
 
 Former NHLer Jönsson Sets Standard for Team Sweden from NHL.com.  Retrieved 15 February 2007.

1972 births
Calgary Flames draft picks
Färjestad BK players
Ice hockey players at the 1994 Winter Olympics
Ice hockey players at the 1998 Winter Olympics
Ice hockey players at the 2002 Winter Olympics
Ice hockey players at the 2006 Winter Olympics
IIHF Hall of Fame inductees
Living people
Medalists at the 2006 Winter Olympics
Medalists at the 1994 Winter Olympics
Mighty Ducks of Anaheim players
New York Islanders players
Olympic ice hockey players of Sweden
Olympic gold medalists for Sweden
Olympic medalists in ice hockey
People from Ängelholm Municipality
Rögle BK players
Swedish ice hockey centres
Swedish expatriate ice hockey players in the United States
Sportspeople from Skåne County
Växjö Lakers coaches
Swedish Hockey League coaches